PFM-1 is a scatterable high explosive anti-personnel land mine of Soviet and Russian production. It is also known as a Green Parrot or Butterfly Mine. The mines can be deployed from mortars, helicopters and aeroplanes in large numbers; they glide to the ground without exploding and will explode later upon contact.

Design
The mine consists of a polyethylene plastic container containing 40 g of explosive liquid. The two wings of the PFM-1 allow it to glide after being released in the air, then spin, stabilising it and slowing its descent. The thick wing contains the liquid explosive. The two wings together are 120 mm (about 5 inches) long. The plastic body can be moulded in a variety of colours for best camouflage. As existing stocks were in European green rather than sand coloured, the first examples used in 1980s Afghanistan were green and easily visible. This led to their name 'green parrots'.

The shape and bright colour is attractive to children, inspiring claims that they were deliberately designed to look like a toy. This was denied by the Soviets and, while the mines did endanger children, there is no evidence to suggest they were designed to look appealing.

The mine comes in two variants: PFM-1 and PFM-1S. The only difference between the two variants is that the PFM-1S comes with a self-liquidation mechanism, which activates within 1 to 40 hours, depending on the weather conditions. The mines cannot be laid manually and must be laid only using minelaying systems, such as remote mining machine UMZ, portable mining kit - PKM (mortar), and those present on MLRS, helicopters (VSM-1 mine system) or airplanes. The remote minelaying systems can only use cluster munition containing PFM-1 mines. The cassettes that contain the PFM-1 mines are KSF-1 (72 PFM-1), KSF-1S (64 PFM-1S) or KSF-1S-0.5 (36 PFM-1 and 36 PFM-1S).

Because the mine is so light, it can be carried in waterways and move downstream after heavy rains or melting snow. The PFM-1 mines are notorious for attaining good camouflage in the conditions of dense foliage, snow or sand.

Action 
The mine is stored with a pin restraining a detonating plunger. Once the arming pin is removed, the plunger is slowly forced forward by a spring until it contacts the detonator, at which point it is armed.

Deformation of the soft plastic skin of the mine forces the arming plunger to strike the detonator, detonating the mine. Because the body of the mine is a single cumulative pressure primer, it is extremely dangerous to handle the mine: The Imperial War Museum states that "A pressure in excess of 5kg would activate the mine". Holding it between the thumb and forefinger may be enough to make it explode. The charge is usually nonlethal, although sufficient to maim.

Destruction 
The PFM-1(S) mines can be destroyed by mechanical or explosive means; they cannot be disarmed. The mines are generally moved using a scoop that is at least 3 meters long, and has soft materials used in its construction (for example, plastic). The operator should ideally wear personal protection, such as a protective screen, gloves and face covering that has at least 8–10 mm of PMMA.  If the mines are to be destroyed mechanically, then they should be driven on by the tracks of an armoured vehicle, or impacted with a load weighing at least 60 kg. Otherwise, the technician must place 0.2 kg of explosive with an electric detonator using a scoop at least 4–5m long.  The requirement to use soft materials for the scoop comes from secondary fragments that may be generated as a result of the mine exploding: if the scoop has metallic materials, or if the mine is placed on solid materials, such as asphalt, it could generate secondary fragmentation and potentially wound the defuser, or people around them.  The mines are always to be approached with caution as it is sometimes impossible to tell the PFM-1 mine version and the mine's self-destruction mechanism may actuate.

Compliance with the Ottawa Convention
In 2017, the government of Belarus announced that it had destroyed its stockpiles of PFM-1 mines. The last 78 PFM-1 mines held by Belarus were destroyed as the highlight of the closing ceremony marking the elimination of their landmine stock.

Ukraine stated that its stockpile of PFM-1 mines in 1999 was 6,000,000 units. In a November 2008 presentation, Ukraine indicated that it had destroyed 101,088 PFM-1 mines per the convention in 1999. Following the agreement between the Cabinet of Ministers of Ukraine and NSPA (formerly known as NAMSO) on 1st September 2012, a three-way agreement between Ukraine, NSPA the EU was signed, which figurated that the EU would provide 3.689 million euros for the destruction of 3.3 million mines. In 2013, the NSPA provided assistance in destruction of 300,000 mines. In 2014, Ukraine submitted a document to the Mine Ban Treaty Third Review Conference, stating that it has destroyed 568,248 mines since the ratification, with an additional 576 mines in 2014, leaving its stockpile at 5,434,672 mines. After failing to adhere to the Ottawa treaty deadline of November 2018 on the destruction of its anti-personnel mines, Ukraine requested the deadline be extended til 1 June 2021, later asking for further extension on 8 June 2020. The effort for the destruction fizzled out towards 2019 and 2020, with only 67,236 destroyed in 2019. In 2020, Ukraine refused to destroy any PFM-1 mines. In 2021, Ukraine's PFM-1 stockpile is reported at 3,363,828 mines, with no further submissions of their destruction.

Military use

Afghanistan 

PFM-1 was used during the Soviet Invasion of Afghanistan, allegedly resulting in a high number of casualties among children from being mistaken for a toy due to its shape and coloring.

Ukraine 
The Ukrainian government alleged that the Russian Federation deployed PFM-1 mines during the 2022 Russian invasion of Ukraine. In March 2022, Deutsche Welle found no evidence to support this accusation. In June, Human Rights Watch reported that Russia had used "at least seven types of antipersonnel mines in at least four regions of Ukraine: Donetsk, Kharkiv, Kyiv, and Sumy", but could not ascertain PFM-1 use in its briefing. HRW found no credible information about Ukraine using any anti-personnel mines, but said in January 2023 that its team "saw physical evidence of PMF antipersonnel mine use in seven of the nine areas around Izyum" in Kharkiv Oblast, and urged the Ukrainian government to investigate possible PMF use by its forces.

In Russian-controlled Donetsk, many PFM-1 were dispersed widely, and Russian and local sources accused the Ukrainian army of being responsible for their deployment. There have been reported casualties, most prominently Semen Pegov, a Russian war blogger calling himself "War Gonzo".

Similar weapons
The PFM-1 is very similar to the BLU-43 landmine used by the US Army in Operation Igloo White in Laos during the Vietnam War. According to a U.S. military document, the Soviet military created PFM-1 after reverse-engineering BLU-43.

Specifications (PFM-1S) 
Dimensions: 119x64x20 mm
Activation pressure:  of VS-6D liquid explosive
Weight:
Mine: 
Charge: 
KSF-1 cassette: 
Shelf life: 10 years
Temperature range of use: −40 to +50 °С
Fuse: MVDM/VGM-572
Self-liquidation timeframe: 1–40 hours

See also
Ottawa Treaty
Organization for Mine Clearance and Afghan Rehabilitation

PMN mine

Notes

External links
http://www.one-step-beyond.de/en/countries/afghanistan/mines/afghanistan_mine_pfm-1.html

Anti-personnel mines
Cold War weapons of the Soviet Union
Land mines of the Soviet Union
Submunitions
Weapons of Russia